Codys is a community in Queens County, New Brunswick  named after the United Empire Loyalist Cody Family. The 2006 Canadian Census found a population of 406.

History

Notable people

 H. A. Cody, novelist
 Judson Hetherington, politician
 H. Aon Hetherington, politician

References

 Codys community demographics from Industry Canada.

Communities in Queens County, New Brunswick